Gloria Burgos (born 28 January 1970) is a Bolivian sprinter. She competed in the women's 4 × 400 metres relay at the 1992 Summer Olympics.

References

External links
 

1970 births
Living people
Athletes (track and field) at the 1992 Summer Olympics
Bolivian female sprinters
Olympic athletes of Bolivia
Place of birth missing (living people)
Olympic female sprinters